The national badge of Tokelau depicts a , which is a traditional Tokelauan carved wooden “tackle box” used by local fishermen.

Tokelau's parliament, the General Fono, uses an identical design surmounted by St Edward's Crown.

History
The General Fono approved a design for a national emblem in May 2008. Prior to 2008, the coat of arms of New Zealand and the flag of New Zealand were used. A new flag was also adopted at the same time.

The badge of the General Fono of Tokelau is the national emblem with the Royal Crown. It was approved by Garter Principal King of Arms and Queen Elizabeth II and presented to the Ulu-o-Tokelau, Aliki Faipule Salesio Lui, on 7 October 2013 by Governor-General Sir Jerry Mateparae.

Blazon
The heraldic blazon for the badge of the General Fono of Tokelau is given as:

“A representation of a Tuluma or carved wooden Fishing Tackle Box proper charged with ten Lozenges conjoined in cross six palewise in pale and four fesswise in fess Argent the whole ensigned by a Royal Crown proper. Below on a scroll “Tokelau mo te Atua.””

See also
 Flag of Tokelau
 Te Atua o Tokelau

References

External links
Tuluma (Fishing Tacle Box) on the website of Te Papa, Museum of New Zealand

Tokelau
Tokelau
Tuvalu
Tokelau
2008 introductions